Julio Berrocal (22 May 1897 – 11 August 1991) was a Peruvian artist. His work was part of the art competition at the 1932 Summer Olympics.

References

1897 births
1991 deaths
Peruvian artists
Olympic competitors in art competitions
People from Ica, Peru